Braden is a surname.

Notable people with the surname "Braden" include

A
Alan Braden (1927–2021), British composer
Alison Braden (born 1982), Canadian water polo player
Andrew D. Braden (1916–1993), American professor
Anne Braden (1924–2006), American activist

B
Ben Braden (born 1994), American football player
Bernard Braden (1916–1993), English actor and comedian
Bill Braden (born 1954), Canadian politician
Bob Braden (1934–2018), American computer scientist

C
Carl Braden (1914–1975), American activist
Charles S. Braden (1887–1970), American professor
C. O. Braden (1891–1969), American football coach

D
Dallas Braden (born 1983), American baseball player
David Braden (1917–1980), American football player
Don Braden (born 1963), American saxophonist

G
George Braden (born 1949), Canadian politician
George C. Braden (1868–1942), American politician
Glen Everton Braden (1899–1967), Canadian merchant and politician
Gregg Braden (born 1954), American writer

H
Henry Braden (1944–2013), American lawyer

J
John Braden (disambiguation), multiple people

K
Kim Braden (born 1949), English actress

M
Marv Braden (1938–2022), American football and lacrosse coach
Miche Braden (born 1953), American singer
Mrs. Findley Braden (1858–1939), American author, newspaper editor, and elocutionist

P
Polly Braden (born 1974), Scottish filmmaker

R
Ron Braden (1948–2012), American football and baseball coach

S
Samuel Braden (1914–2003), American academic administrator
Susan G. Braden (born 1948), American judge
Spruille Braden (1894–1978), American diplomat

T
Thomas H. Braden (1874–1941), American politician
Tom Braden (1917–2009), American journalist
Travis Braden (born 1994), American stock car racing driver

V
Vic Braden (1929–2014), American tennis player

W
William Robert Braden (1858–1922), Canadian politician

See also
Braden (disambiguation), a disambiguation page for "Braden"
Braden (given name), a page for people with the given name "Braden"
Senator Braden (disambiguation), a disambiguation page for Senators surnamed "Braden"